Darwin is a given name. Notable people with the name include:

Darwin Atapuma (born 1988), Colombian cyclist
Darwin Cerén (born 1989), Salvadoran footballer
Darwin Cook (born 1958), American basketball coach and former player
Darwin Echeverry (born 1996), Spanish sprinter
Darwin Abel Finney (1814–1868), American politician
Darwin Gonnerman (1947–2015), Canadian football player
Darwin Hall (1844–1919), American politician
Darwin Joston (1937–1998), American actor
Darwin K. Kyle (1921–1951), U.S. Army soldier
Darwin Machís (born 1993), Venezuelan footballer
Darwin Núñez (born 1999), Uruguayan footballer 
Darwin Peña (born 1977), Bolivian football 
Darwin Quintero (born 1987), Colombian footballer
Darwin Pinzón (born 1994), Panamanian footballer 
Darwin Ríos (born 1991), Bolivian footballer
Darwin Teilhet (1904–1964), American novelist
Darwin Torres (born 1991), Uruguayan footballer

See also

Darvin (given name)
Darwin (surname)
Derwin, given name and surname
Deorwine, Old English version of Darwin